Agrotis kinabaluensis is a moth of the family Noctuidae. It is endemic to Borneo.

External links
Species info

Agrotis
Moths of Asia
Moths described in 1976